Tilloy-lès-Mofflaines is a commune in the Pas-de-Calais department in the Hauts-de-France region of France.

Geography
Tilloy-lès-Mofflaines lies on the south-eastern side of Arras, at the junction of the N39, D34 and D60 roads.

Population

Places of interest
 The church of St.Brice, rebuilt, along with the rest of the village after the First World War.
 The Commonwealth War Graves Commission cemetery.

See also
Communes of the Pas-de-Calais department

References

External links

 The Tilloy CWGC cemetery

Tilloylesmofflaines